"Zombie" is a protest song by Irish alternative rock band the Cranberries, written by the band's lead singer Dolores O'Riordan about The Troubles in Northern Ireland. It was released on 19 September 1994 as the lead single from their second studio album, No Need to Argue (1994), two weeks ahead of the album's release. Music critics have long recognised "Zombie" as "a masterpiece of alternative rock", as well as a grunge number uncharacteristic of the band's other work.

"Zombie" reached No. 1 on the charts of Australia, Belgium, Denmark, France, Germany, and Iceland, as well as on the US Billboard Modern Rock Tracks chart. The song was voted by Australian radio Triple J listeners as No. 1 on the 1994 Triple J Hottest 100 chart. It won the Best Song Award at the 1995 MTV Europe Music Awards.

In 2017, the song was released as an acoustic, stripped-down version on the band's Something Else album. In April 2020, it became the first song by an Irish band to surpass one billion views on YouTube. As of October 2022, Zombie has been streamed over 800 million times on Spotify and as of December 2021, has sold 778,942 copies in the United Kingdom.

Background 
During the Troubles, more than 3,500 people died and tens of thousands were injured in more than 30 years of the complex and often brutal conflict. The IRA, which was devoted both to removing British forces from Northern Ireland and to unifying Ireland, killed almost 2,000 people during this time. During this time, over 10,000 bomb attacks were perpetrated in Northern Ireland, the Republic of Ireland and England, in an armed conflict fought between the Provisional IRA, the Ulster loyalist paramilitaries, and the British security forces.

The song was written in response to the death of Johnathan Ball, 3, and Tim Parry, 12, who had been killed in the IRA bombing in Warrington, northwest England, when two devices hidden in litter bins were detonated. Ball died at the scene of the bombing as a result of his shrapnel-inflicted injuries and, five days later, Parry lost his life as a result of head injuries. 56 others were injured, some seriously. Parry died in his father's arms in Liverpool's Walton hospital. The two boys had gone shopping to buy Mother's Day cards on one of the town's busiest shopping streets.

Composition 
O’Riordan had "a feeling" that she had to write a song that reflected upon the event, before the song came to her "subconsciously" midway through the Cranberries' English Tour in 1993. Writing the core chords on her acoustic guitar, O'Riordan returned to Ireland and continued to write the song after returning to her apartment after a night out. The lyrics and chords of "Zombie" were written initially on an acoustic guitar by O'Riordan alone late that night—"I remember being in my flat, coming up with the chorus, which was catchy and anthemic", O'Riordan was to recall.

The song structure was created and shaped without hindrance. The hook and the chorus "just came out really fast", then the verses came "quite easily", just as the writing of the lyrics, governed by no inhibitions—"they just came pouring out", she said. O'Riordan took the song into the Cranberries' small rehearsal shed in Mungret, near Limerick city, and it was translated onto an electric guitar. Drummer Fergal Lawler observed that O'Riordan was adamant that she wanted more distortion pedals on the guitars and asked for more strength than usual in drumming. In 2017, O'Riordan said, "It was the most aggressive song we'd written". According to Lawler, a rough version of the song was initially titled "In Your Head", which was included in the band's live set; it was then later revised to "Zombie". The Cranberries' popularity grew exponentially during the North America Tour in 1993, promoting the release of their first album Everybody Else Is Doing It, So Why Can't We?, which earned them fans eagerly awaiting the band's second album.

Production and release 

In early 1994, the Cranberries began performing "Zombie" in its final shape, and audiences responded with enthusiasm. The song was recorded and mixed at The Manor Studio in Oxford and at Townhouse Studios in London in 1994 with producer Stephen Street. They spent a long time working on getting the guitar settings right to give a suitably expansive sound. The sound came organically, while raising the volume, O'Riordan said "because we were using our live instruments, we were plugging in a lot, and we started to mess around with feedback and distortion". The song, recorded during the grunge era, features a foggy, sludgy electric guitars sound, representing a radical departure from the band's signature sound of the early years—based largely on jangly guitar and strings.
 
Particularly offended that terrorists claimed to have carried out these acts in the name of Ireland, O'Riordan asserted: "The IRA are not me. I'm not the IRA. The Cranberries are not the IRA. My family are not. When it says in the song, 'It's not me, it's not my family,' that's what I'm saying. It's not Ireland, it's some idiots living in the past". At the time, O'Riordan received criticism for "Zombie"s "hard-hitting lyrics"; she nevertheless pointed out that the song was written from a humanitarian point of view. O'Riordan had been the focus of a battle over censorship, she had to fight to see the song even released as the record label was intent on preventing "Zombie" from reaching the airwaves. The Cranberries' former manager Allen Kovac stated that Island Records urged them not to release the "politically urgent" song as a single, and that O'Riordan had ripped up a $1-million cheque the label offered her to work on another song. "Dolores was a very small, fragile person, but very opinionated," said Kovac. "Her belief was that she was an international artist and she wanted to break the rest of the world, and 'Zombie' was part of that evolution. She felt the need to expand beyond 'I love you, you love me' and write about what was happening in Ireland at the time", he said. Island Records and management also claimed that the song was "too controversial, you might not get played on the radio". Lawler recalled arguing to the record label that they "had been playing it live for a year", and telling them that "for a new song that the audience hadn't heard before, they really reacted to it". Over time, "[w]e pushed and pushed and eventually they decided to release it", he said. The release of the song occurred on the path to IRA's historic ceasefire announcement on 31 August 1994.

By the time the single for "Zombie" was released on 19 September 1994, as well as No Need to Argue the following month, with an accompanying music video for the song in heavy rotation on MTV, the Cranberries were catapulted to international stardom. Shortly after the song and video came out, ideological beliefs came rushing to the forefront of local newspapers, criticizing O'Riordan for "writing about the Troubles"; of these comments, she "knew that would be the angle of the song, because it was controversial". Assessing the cultural impact of their song, Hogan responded: "Because of this song, people thought we were a political band. ... Far from it. Dolores always wrote from the heart". O'Riordan would later state, "If I think something, I have to say it. And I really don't care what anybody thinks, you know?". NPRs Andrew Limbong, speaking after O'Riordan's death in 2018, said "even though it was a political song, it wasn't necessarily politics she was interested in writing about". O'Riordan said, "I just cannot accept children being slaughtered at the hands of political violence", and hoped that "it might make people reflect a bit on our society and what we've become." In 1994, "Zombie" was "the most played song ever on alternative radio in the history of America", as mentioned in the Los Angeles Times and in Kenneth L. Campbell's book, Ireland's History – Prehistory to the Present. In retrospect, The New York Times and Billboard considered them as "one of the biggest rock bands in the world" of the 1990s.

Music and lyrics 
"Zombie" has been characterised by commentators as alternative rock and grunge. O'Riordan later said that the song was not a concerted effort to ride the grunge movement, but she stated that "this wasn't grunge, but the timing was good", adding, that "[w]e were just a different type of a band... and we had a lot of our own ideas". The band's guitarist Noel Hogan noted in a Rolling Stone interview that the Cranberries were beforehand accepted by "the same kind of [grunge] audience". O'Riordan was responsible for the heavier sound, a mere expression of her musical taste, as she would say later "we got it out of our system... all that anger out of our system". Discussing the musical approach for the song and the requirement of a sound significantly louder, Hogan explained in a 2012 interview with Amsterdam's FaceCulture that "the heavier sound was the right thing for the song. If it was soft, it wouldn’t have had that impact. It would stand out in the live set because of that".

O'Riordan never revealed the origin of the "zombie" reference in the lyrics, a concept which admits a personal interpretation of its meaning. However, there was a divergence of opinion among writers on the subject. Ed Power formulated his own hypothesis, saying that the word Zombie was "a commentary on how blindly cleaving to centuries old prejudices can reduce [one's] capacity for independent thought". Graham Fuller commented that the metaphor perhaps "reanimates the children whose deaths inspired O'Riordan to write it". Sonia Saraiya had a different view, saying that the Zombie is not the dead children, but "the dead children that populate your mind; the dead bodies you've seen in the images that you can't forget".

Singing voice 
O'Riordan is yodeling when she does the sharp break from chest register to head register–falsetto in the second syllable of the word Zom-bie. These rapid and repeated changes in pitch in O'Riordan's yodel, paired with the amplified method that she uses to form her vowels and consonants, set her voice in the sean-nós singing style. This creates a vocal trademark when combined with the Gaelic keening, the lilting vocables, and sung in her thick Irish accent. Author Bart Plantenga wrote in his book Yodel in Hi-Fi: From Kitsch Folk to Contemporary Electronica that "[h]er waify, quavering, breaking voice has a natural 'Celtic yodel' in it. It can also be heard on 'Zombie [and other songs] used "for fantastic emotional effect". Mikael Wood of Los Angeles Times described O'Riordan "pushing her voice to a jagged extreme to embody the pain", with a "desperate, yodeling vocal that conjures some ancient emotion". Far Out Magazine commented that her vocal performance was "guttural, pleading, captivating and utterly unique, O'Riordan begs for humanity the only way she knew how". Sonia Saraiya, music and TV critic from Miami Herald and Chicago Tribune, wrote that her voice "often seemed bigger than her petite frame", and also commented that the chorus "practically grunted out of her otherwise bell-like voice with a guttural vowel sound".

{{Cquote|They insisted on being genuine, original innovators, crafting their own place in the ethos of alternative rock. [ ... ] The Cranberries are masters of the craft. But O'Riordan's voice is just in a league all its own. She makes no effort to hide her accent. In fact, it adds a richness and character to her voice. O’Riordan lays it all out on the table. Beautifully. Uncompromising and unrelenting. O'Riordan sinks her hooks into you and holds you hostage with her breathtaking vocal onslaught.
|author=Joe Hughes
|source=How The Cranberries Blew Away Nirvana With Definitive Grunge Song "Zombie" – Alternative Nation.}}

 Critical reception Tedium's editor Ernie Smith said, "O'Riordan wrote it in a moment of anger and passion", and called the song "one of the defining songs of the alternative rock era". In a different perspective, Rebecca Black of Belfast Telegraph described "Zombie" as an "outraged response to the Warrington bombs", while music reporter Mark Savage wrote that "her pain was real", describing it as "a visceral response to the death of two children". In a contemporary review, Hot Press hailed the song and its arrangements, saying that it was stylistically different from the band's previous works: "Staccato rhythms and subtle jerks and pauses in the music and the singing make this more than just business-as-usual for the Cranberries. A slow, brooding Siouxsie-like buzzing guitar melody and dirge-like bass and drums counterpoint the elliptical and impassioned vocals of Dolores O’Riordan as she works her way through the internal psychic and external human tragedies of the Troubles [...] "Zombie" signals a growth in confidence". The Rough Guide to Rock identified the album No Need to Argue as "more of the same" as the Cranberries' debut album, except for the song "Zombie", which had an "angry grunge" sound and "aggressive" lyrics. Music critic Evelyn McDonnell allowed that O'Riordan had a "certain naivety to her and also a real toughness". New York arts editor Graham Fuller partially echoed this view, saying "she was right, but that naivety serves a song that's an unfiltered reaction to a tragedy. It goes with Zombie's primal fury; slicker lyrics would have diluted the song's rawness". AllMusic said the song "trivialised" the events of the Troubles, and that the "heavy rock trudge" of the song did not play to the band's strengths.

Music critic Neil McCormick wrote that it was the Cranberries' "fiercest rock song... An accusatory lament, it grapples with the endless recriminations of the Irish Troubles, with a slow rolling bass line and thumping mid-tempo beat, finding tension between melodic delicacy and introspection in the verses with a keening, wailing chorus charged with distorted grungy guitars". Music & Media stated that it "combines moody soundscapes with some grunge-y guitar attacks that together make an arresting number". Charles Aaron from Spin commented, "I like "Zombie" because its crunching, troubled guitar fuzz was the loudest thing on MTV during the last days of '94. Just ask Bono, my Irish Setter. He's still wailing." Josh Jones of Open Culture, described the "Gen X heyday"s song, as  "O'Riordan's stadium-size hit ... and its beautifully pained laments and pointedly unsubtle yelps and wails—a stunning expression of mourning that reverberates still some 25 years later". Martin Aston of Music Week wrote: "Having broken the UK on the back of their US success, The Cranberries continue to use their pop acumen to fashion wonderful, wistful pop nuggets. Zombie is a little heavier and less user-friendly than Linger and Dreams, but no less sublime for it." In 2018, Billboard and Stereogum ranked the song number three and number two, respectively, on their lists of the top ten Cranberries songs.

On 16 January 2018, following O'Riordan's death, Colin Parry, father of IRA victim Tim Parry, thanked O'Riordan for the "both majestic and also very real lyrics". "Many people have become immune to the pain and suffering that so many people experienced during that armed campaign", he said. "To read the words written by an Irish band in such a compelling way was very, very powerful."

 Accolades 
On 23 November 1995, the Cranberries won the Best Song Award for "Zombie" at the 1995 MTV Europe Music Awards, beating Michael Jackson, Seal, The Offspring and TLC.

 Chart performance 
"Zombie" topped the charts in eight countries. On 29 October 1994, the song went to No. 1 on the US Billboard Alternative Airplay chart, spending twenty-three weeks on the chart. Australian audiences were "particularly gripped by the song". Triple J listeners voted for "Zombie" as No. 1 on the Triple J Hottest 100, 1994 chart, one of the largest public music polls in the world, establishing for the first time ever that a female vocalist won the Triple J Hottest 100. On 18 December 1994, the song reached No. 1 on the ARIA Singles Chart, where it remained for seven consecutive weeks. The single peaked at No. 1 and spent twenty eight weeks on the Official German Charts. On 25 December 1994, the single debuted at No. 27 on the Ö3 Austria Top 40, and climbed to No. 2, where it stayed for eight weeks. "Zombie" debuted on the French SNEP Top 100 at No. 4 on 25 February 1995. The following week, the single moved to No. 1; it spent nine consecutive weeks at the top and a total of twenty-four weeks on the singles chart.

Island Records declined the prospect of releasing "Zombie" as a single to US stores, stating they didn't want to run counter to the band's original ethos. Music critic Jon Bream of Star Tribune elaborated succinctly the label's analysis: "For the band, it's a question of credibility". Bream further noted that Island Records "simply didn't want the industry to typecast the Cranberries as a Top 40 act". After releasing the song, later in the year, the Cranberries affirmed their alternative identity, saying that they "didn't want to be considered just a pop band". Drummer Fergal Lawler said, "[t]hen you can go to the other extreme of being so alternative that no one buys your records. Luckily, we're kind of in the middle. We're a mix of pop, rock and alternative, I suppose".

 Music video 

 Background and production 
"Zombie" was released with a music video in October 1994. The video was directed by Samuel Bayer, and produced by Doug Friedman and HSI. Productions. The music video was filmed in Belfast, Northern Ireland, in the heart of the Troubles with real footage, and in Dublin. Bayer's argument for being able to record video footage of murals, children and soldiers on patrol in Belfast was made under a false pretext. "We had a [cover] story that we were making a documentary about the peace-keeping efforts in Ireland", he said. O'Riordan remembered Bayer telling her "how tense it was and how he was blown away by the whole thing. He got footage of the kids jumping from one building to another, and he got a lot of footage of the army. He was a very good director". The performance footage in colour was filmed on a sound stage in Los Angeles over a period of six days.

 Synopsis 
In the video, O'Riordan is covered in gold makeup and appears in front of a giant cross with a group of boys covered in silver makeup holding bows and arrows. The video also includes clips of local children playing war games, a performance by the band, and of British soldiers from the Argyll and Sutherland Highlanders (as evident from their thin red line tactical recognition flashes) on patrol in Northern Ireland. It also features shots of various murals (IRA, UDA, UFF, UVF, Bobby Sands).

 BBC and RTÉ ban 
The music video for "Zombie" was banned by the BBC because of its "violent images". It was also banned by the RTÉ, Ireland's national broadcaster. Instead, both the BBC and the RTÉ opted to broadcast an edited version focusing on footage of the band in a live performance, a version that the Cranberries essentially disowned. Despite their efforts to maintain the original video "out of view from the public", some of the initial footage prevailed, with scenes of children holding guns. The song reached No. 14 on the UK Singles Chart.

 Reception and accolades 
The song and music video reflected a time and place, as well as an important piece of Irish identity, which "resonated with millions of people all over the world". "Zombie" received heavy rotation on MTV Europe and was A-listed on Germany's VIVA in December 1994. The video gained a nomination for Best Alternative Video at the 1995 MTV Europe Music Awards. Writer Josh Jones commented that "The 'Zombie' video offers a classic collection of 90s stylistic quirks, from Derek Jarman–inspired setpieces to the use of black and white and earnest political messaging". He added, "[f]or us old folks, it's an almost pure hit of nostalgia, and for the young, a nearly perfect specimen of the decade's rock aesthetics". On 23 October 2019, "Zombie" was ranked No. 5 on a "definitive list of the world's most-viewed rock music videos", released by Vevo.

On 18 April 2020, the official music video had succeeded in reaching over 1 billion views on YouTube and became the first female-led song, first song by an Irish artist, and sixth song from the 20th century to reach the milestone. Bassist Mike Hogan said of the achievement that "I can still remember making such a great video and seeing the impact that it had – and still does – on people". On 20 April 2020, the music video for "Zombie" remastered in 4K resolution was officially released for YouTube with previously unseen footage from the original video shoot.

In November 2022, the song was voted as the greatest Irish hit of all time by RTÉ 2fm listeners in compiling the ultimate Irish playlist    for a television special shown on RTÉ One.

 Live performances 
A version of "Zombie" was already played one year before the release of No Need to Argue, on the band's first European tour with Hothouse Flowers, after the release of Everybody Else Is Doing It, So Why Can't We?.

On 13 August 1994, two months prior to the release of No Need to Argue, the Cranberries performed at the Woodstock '94 music festival in New York. Towards the end of "Zombie", O'Riordan embodied what it meant to her, dedicating the song to others, like the victims of ethnic cleansing, she declared that "this song is our cry against man's inhumanity to man, inhumanity to child", adding, "and war, babies dying, and Belfast, and Bosnia, and Rwanda".

The Cranberries kept "Zombie" in their concert setlists throughout their career. On 11 November 1994, the Cranberries featured as the musical guest on US talk show Late Show with David Letterman, performing the lead single one month after No Need to Argue was released. Junkee music editor Jules LeFevre, wrote that the footage captured "O'Riordan's extraordinary voice" and considered the live performance as "straight-up sublime".

On 14 February 1995, the band recorded a nine-song set including "Zombie", for MTV Unplugged, at the Brooklyn Academy of Music in New York City. Their acoustic performance was accompanied by Electra Strings quartet first aired on 18 April 1995.

On 25 February 1995, the Cranberries played the song on their appearance on the US show Saturday Night Live, in a slow tempo performance that British author Dave Thompson called "one of the most powerful performances that the show has ever seen". The episode came a week after record producer Denny Cordell, an early mentor to the Cranberries, had passed away. Writer Ed Power wrote that the performance "has the rawness of early grief", while Rolling Stone would later declare it "one of the greatest SNL turns".

The band released a stripped-down version of "Zombie", recorded for Something Else, an unplugged album that features acoustic renditions of songs from their catalog, accompanied by the Limerick-based Irish Chamber Orchestra. The song appeared on the set list of their 2017 tour, featuring the Irish Chamber Orchestra's string quartet.

On 3 October 2019, the three surviving members of the Cranberries released footage on YouTube of the band performing "Zombie" live at the Astoria 2 in London in January 1994, taken from their live DVD titled the Cranberries Live. The song was fully formed and played eight months before it was released as a single.

 Censorship 
In March 2003, on the eve of the outbreak of war in Iraq, the British Government and the Independent Television Commission issued a statement saying ITC's Programme Code would temporarily remove from broadcast songs and music videos featuring "sensitive material", including "Zombie".
Numerous media groups complied with the decision to avoid "offending public feeling", along with MTV Europe. Since it violated the ITC guidelines, "Zombie" was placed on a blacklist of songs, targeting its official music video. The censorship was lifted once the Iraq conflict was over.

In August 2006, CBS censored an American Rock Star Supernova contestant's rendition of "Zombie", as a result of the lyrics and deleted all mentions of tanks, bombs and guns. Although CBS declined to comment, an employee claimed they were "worried that the song might be seen as an anti-Iraq War statement".

 In popular culture 

Mixed martial artist The Korean Zombie has used "Zombie" as his entrance song since his 2012 fight with Dustin Poirier.
Baseball player Chris Taylor selected "Zombie" as his entrance song for the 2019 Los Angeles Dodgers season.
The song features at the climax of Derry Girls series 2, episode 5 following the announcement of the IRA's ceasefire.
The song was used in the second season of the Roswell, New Mexico television series as the background music for the scenes of the first episode titled "Stay (I Missed You)" that aired on 16 March 2020. Showrunner Carina Adly Mackenzie said that the song was used for several reasons, including as a "political connotation", adding that "[i]t's an incredibly powerful song" evoking "a lot of emotion".
The song features in the fourth episode of the first season of This Way Up when Aisling Bea and Sharon Horgan sing it as their characters Aine and Shona, respectively.
In 2021, the song's acoustic version appeared on the soundtrack of Zack Snyder's film Army of the Dead. The song was played at the film's end.
In 2023, drag queen contestant, Sasha Colby, gave a dance performance to the song in the season 15 premiere episode of RuPaul's Drag Race.

 Formats and track listings 

 Personnel 

 Dolores O'Riordan – vocals, electric guitar
 Noel Hogan – electric guitar
 Mike Hogan – bass guitar
 Fergal Lawler – drums

 Charts 
 Weekly charts 

 Year-end charts 

Decade-end charts

 Certifications and sales 

}

Bad Wolves cover

The American heavy metal band Bad Wolves recorded a cover of "Zombie" in 2017 while they were working on their debut album Disobey. The band's singer Tommy Vext slightly altered the lyrics, inserting a reference to drones and replacing "since 1916" (Easter Rising in Dublin), with "in 2018" which referenced back to the original version and also referred to the release date of their debut album. The band also added two extra stanzas to the end of the song which were not present in the original. However, Vext said that "we weren't sure it if was going to make it onto the record. The song is a masterpiece and a massive hit. Some art is sacred—you become afraid to do a rendition of it". On 21 December 2017, Vext met Dan Waite—the Internal managing director of Bad Wolves' record label Eleven Seven Label Group-Europe and a long-time close friend of O'Riordan—backstage at London's Wembley Arena at a heavy metal concert. Then he asked Waite to send her the cover for consideration as well as her approval for its release. Vext commented that "I just got the courage to ask him to send her the song to see if she would approve of it. It's always a jarring thing to take on someone's piece of work: especially as the Cranberries were a massive band, and 'Zombie' was probably their biggest song". On Christmas Eve 2017, Waite sent a text message to Vext that said O'Riordan had offered to "sing on it". Vext described the situation: "it was a dream come true", while the others musicians "almost didn't believe it".

On 14 January 2018, O'Riordan flew from her home in New York City to London. According to O'Riordan's agent, Lindsey Holmes, the primary purpose of her flight was for a studio mixing session on Monday and Tuesday with Martin "Youth" Glover for her side project's second album, and she was also due to meet with the Cranberries' record label BMG. On 15 January 2018, at 1:12 am GMT at her Mayfair hotel in London, O'Riordan left a voice message to Waite, where she expressed her thoughts, describing the cover as "awesome". She also invited Waite to come in the studio, slated for later that morning, and listen to the results of her vocals recording. O'Riordan was later found unresponsive in the bathroom and confirmed dead at 09:16 am. Following her death, Bad Wolves said,

TMZ published O'Riordan's final voice message on 5 April 2018. Bad Wolves released the cover on 18 January 2018 as the second single from their debut album Disobey. The cover was released without her vocals as a tribute. The cover topped the US Billboard Mainstream Rock chart in May 2018 for three weeks and peaked at No. 54 on the Hot 100. In June 2018, at a concert in New York City, Bad Wolves donated $250,000 to O'Riordan's children. The idea of making a donation was set up by Allen Kovac, Eleven Seven Label Group founder, and former manager of the Cranberries, who also managed them during the original release of "Zombie".

In an interview, bassist Kyle Konkiel shared his thoughts on the new cover's sound:

Music video
The song's music video was directed by Wayne Isham and was released on 18 January 2018, the day before the band released the song as a single.

The video begins with text discussing the cover's background and the passing of O'Riordan. The video then cuts to shots of the band performing the song in a black room, wearing black clothing and playing black instruments interspersed with close-up scenes of a woman being covered in gold paint. The video then cuts in between shots of the band performing and the woman interacting with Vext which mainly involves her smearing gold paint on a glass pane between the two of them. After the guitar solo, she etches "1-15-18", the date of O'Riordan's death, into the paint. The woman's appearance (gold body paint, gold dress, and gold beaded headdress) is nearly identical to that of O'Riordan in the Cranberries' original Zombie music video. The video ends with a quote by Vext.

Charts

Weekly charts

Year-end charts

 Certifications and sales 

Miley Cyrus cover

On 18 October 2020, American singer Miley Cyrus performed a cover of the song at NIVA Save Our Stages at Whisky a Go Go, a fundraiser concert streamed live on YouTube and that performance quickly became viral online with individuals appreciating Cyrus' fine, raw vocals. Cyrus later on released her live cover to digital and streaming platforms and announced that the track will be one of the two (the latter being another viral take at Blondie's "Heart of Glass") covers that will be a part of her seventh full-studio album Plastic Hearts.

On 20 October 2020, the Cranberries publicly gave Cyrus their seal of approval. Sharing Miley's performance to their official Twitter page, the Cranberries wrote alongside it: "We were delighted to hear of Miley Cyrus' cover of Zombie at the Whisky a Go Go #SOSFEST in LA at the weekend. ... It's one of the finest covers of the song that we've heard. We think Dolores would be very impressed!".

On 28 November 2020, in reaction to the Cranberries "acknowledging it and writing that it honoured Dolores", Cyrus said to Stephen Byrne on RTÉ 2fm: "also [saying that] they liked my interpretation of the song – it just meant a lot". She further stated that she felt like it was "really timely, even though it was a cover and maybe an older song, it just felt like it was super right now", adding that the lyrics "just really resonated" with her.

Charts

Other notable covers

 In late 1994, a cover version by Spanish mákina group Ororo was released in conjunction with the original version. This version reached No. 1 in Spain and No. 16 in Austria.
 In 1995, a Eurodance cover version by Italian quartet A.D.A.M. featuring Amy reached No. 16 in the UK Singles Chart, No. 65 in Australia, No. 20 in France, No. 7 in Ireland, No. 9 in Italy, and No. 35 in Belgium.
 In 2011, Christina Parie covered the song on The X Factor Australia. After her performance, the song re-entered the ARIA Top 100 Singles Chart at No. 69.
 In 2017, Dutch hardstyle DJ Ran-D released a cover of the song on Armada Records which was certified gold in the Netherlands in 2019.
 In February 2018, the pop rock band Dreamers released a cover of the song.
 In 2018, Ghostly Kisses' sophomore EP This City Holds My Heart'' closed with a cover of the song.
 On 16 January 2019, to mark the first anniversary of O'Riordan's death, Chicago rapper Vic Mensa released a cover song through his punk-inspired band named 93Punx. On 27 April 2020, one week after the Cranberries music video reached one billion views on YouTube, 93Punx released their music video including their own live footage and interspersed with scenes from the original video.

See also
 List of anti-war songs

Notes

References

Sources

Further reading 
 
 
 
 
 

1994 singles
1994 songs
The Cranberries songs
2018 debut singles
Bad Wolves songs
Miley Cyrus songs
Number-one singles in Australia
Ultratop 50 Singles (Flanders) number-one singles
Ultratop 50 Singles (Wallonia) number-one singles
Number-one singles in Denmark
SNEP Top Singles number-one singles
Number-one singles in Germany
Number-one singles in Iceland
Number-one singles in Spain
Number-one singles in Zimbabwe
Anti-war songs
Protest songs
1990s ballads
Hard rock ballads
Music videos directed by Samuel Bayer
Songs written by Dolores O'Riordan
Song recordings produced by Stephen Street
Songs about The Troubles (Northern Ireland)
Island Records singles
RCA Records singles
Eleven Seven Label Group singles
Grunge songs
Songs banned by the BBC
Music video controversies
Songs based on actual events